Burt Hara was principal clarinetist with the Minnesota Orchestra from 1987 until 2013. He is now  the Associate Principal in the Los Angeles Philharmonic.

Life and career
Hara is a native of California. He received a Bachelor of Arts degree in 1984 from the Curtis Institute of Music, where his principal teachers were Donald Montanaro, Yehuda Gilad, and Mitchell Lurie.

Before coming to Minnesota, Hara served as principal clarinet of the Alabama Symphony. In 1996, Hara was appointed Principal Clarinet of the Philadelphia Orchestra by Wolfgang Sawallisch, but returned to Minnesota the following year. As a teacher, Hara has held positions at the University of Alabama and the University of Montevallo, and at the University of Minnesota and serves on the faculty at the Aspen Music Festival and School. Hara currently resides in Los Angeles with his family.

Discography
 Dominick Argento: Capriccio for Clarinet and Orchestra (Rossini in Paris), with the Minnesota Orchestra, conducted by Eiji Oue, Reference Recordings, RR-100-CD, 2002

Notes

External links
www.minnesotaorchestramusicians.org 
Profile at the Minnesota Orchestra

American classical clarinetists
Curtis Institute of Music alumni
Living people
21st-century clarinetists
Year of birth missing (living people)
Musicians of the Philadelphia Orchestra
20th-century clarinetists
20th-century American musicians
20th-century American male musicians
20th-century classical musicians
21st-century American musicians
21st-century American male musicians
21st-century classical musicians